The One Woman Idea is a 1929 American drama film directed by Berthold Viertel and written by Marion Orth. The film stars Rod La Rocque, Marceline Day, Shirley Dorman, Sharon Lynn, Sally Phipps and Ivan Lebedeff. The film was released on June 2, 1929, by Fox Film Corporation.

Cast      
Rod La Rocque as Prince Ahmed
Marceline Day as Lady Alicia Douglas / Alizar
Shirley Dorman as Boat Passenger
Sharon Lynn as Boat Passenger
Sally Phipps as Boat Passenger
Ivan Lebedeff as Hosainn
Douglas Gilmore as Lord Douglas
Gino Corrado as Bordinnas
Joseph W. Girard as Steamship Captain
Arnold Lucy as Ali
Françoise Rosay as Zuleide
Jamiel Hasson as Bodyguard
Tom Tamarez as Bodyguard
Coy Watson Jr. as Buttons

References

External links
 

1929 films
1920s English-language films
1929 drama films
Fox Film films
Films directed by Berthold Viertel
American black-and-white films
1920s American films